Laarim (Larim, Longarim) or Narim is a Surmic language spoken by the Laarim people of the Laarim Hills of South Sudan.

Distribution
According to Ethnologue, Laarim is spoken in 10 villages of northern Budi County, Eastern Equatoria State. Stirtz (2011) reports that there are as many as 22,000 speakers, living mainly in 14 villages west of Chukudum town.

References

External links
Narim basic lexicon at the Global Lexicostatistical Database

Languages of South Sudan
Surmic languages